Jinju is a city in South Gyeongsang Province, South Korea. It was the location of the first (1592) and second (1593) Sieges of Jinju by Japanese forces during the Imjin War.  The Republic of Korea Air Force Education and Training Command is located in the eastern part of the city.

History
From old times, Jinju was a fountainhead of national culture and spirit. As a city that has held 1,000-year-old historical heritage of the ancient city, Jinju has been well renowned as a home of patriotic spirit, education, culture and art.

Jinju was an ancient city of Goryeonggaya in the Gaya Era. This city was called 'Geoyeolseong' of Baekje during the Three Kingdom Era, and was called 'Geoyeolju', 'Cheongju', and 'Gangju' during the Unified Silla Era. Name of this city was changed into 'Jinju' for the first time in 940, the 23rd year of King Taejo of the Goryeo Dynasty.

It became 'Jinju-mok', one of 12 moks (local administrative units in Goryeo and Joseon Dynasty) in the 2nd year of King Seongjong (983). In the 33rd year of King Gojong of the Joseon Dynasty (1896), administrative district of the nation was reorganized with 13 provinces. At that time Jinju began to belong to Gyeongsangnam-do, and became capital town of Gyeongsangnam-do. And provincial governor started to reside in Jinju. On April 1, 1925, Busan replaced Jinju as provincial capital.

On August 15, 1949, the government of the Republic of Korea was established and 'the local self-government system' was started. At that time, Jinju-bu was raised to Jinju-si (city) and started to have mayor of the city. On January 1, 1995, in accordance with 'the Law pertaining to the establishment of Urban-Rural Integrated City', Jinju-si and Jinyang-gun became extinct and were merged into one integrated Jinju-si (city).

Culture and festivals
There are cultural events held in Jinju every year. Among these are the Jinju Namgang Lantern Festival which is held in October for approximately ten days. This nationally designated cultural tourism festival, found only in Jinju, features a spectacle of lanterns floating on the Nam River to commemorate the patriotic spirit of the 70,000 militia corps and government troops who died for their country defending Jinju from the Japanese forces during the Imjin War (1592–1598).  Other major festivals include: the Nongae Festival, the Korea Drama Festival, the Gaecheon Arts Festival and the Jinju National Bullfighting Contest.

The Nongae Festival, held in May each year commemorates and celebrates the sacrifice of the patriotic gisaeng (professional Korean entertainer) Nongae's suicide-assassination of a Japanese general together with the 70,000 Koreans who lost their lives in the battle of Jinju Castle during the Imjin War.  The festival features an emotional reenactment of Nongae's suicidal drowning of a Japanese general from uiam bawi (righteous rock) below Chokseongnu (Jinju castle pavilion) on the banks of the Nam River.

Gaecheon Arts Festival is annually held from October 3 to 10 and the entire city turns to the streets for celebration at Korea's first provincial culture art festival, which awakens the artistic spirit of the Korean people.  The festival falls around Gaecheonjeol (National Foundation Day) and is widely regarded as one of Korea's finest.

The Jinju National Bullfighting Contest is recognized as Korea's oldest bullfighting event and spectators can witness a test of strength at this bullfighting contest held at a purpose-built traditional Korean sports arena near Jinyang lake.

The 2023 Asian Weightlifting Championships will be held in Jinju.

Population
At just over a third of a million, Jinju is a relatively small city by Korean standards. The annual growth of the population is 0.4% since 1995. People between the ages of 20 and 29 represent 17.5% of the city's total population, and justify the city's long-standing reputation as an educational city. The senior population (65 years or older), representing 7.6% of the city's total population, is higher than the provincial average (6.8%). This suggests that Jinju is providing senior citizens with livable conditions, such as a variety of welfare programs and pleasant living environment.

Local personality
Gang Se-hwang, a high ranking government official and representative painter, calligrapher and art critic, was born here in 1713, son of Kang Hyeon.

Jinju cuisine

Jinju has a number of distinctive local delicacies which reflect the tastes of Jinju people. Perhaps most celebrated is Jinju bibimbap, which distinguishes itself from the common Korean rice and vegetable dish by its use of yukhoe, made with raw beef and generous amounts of sesame oil. Also famous is Namgang (Nam River) Grilled Eel, which is caught locally and served in any one of the numerous restaurants overlooking the Nam.  Enjoying their food spicy, Jinjuites have also perfected a hot pepper (ttaengcho) version of the popular Korean side dish pajeon (scallion pancake) known by its colloquial name jijimi. This is best enjoyed with a bowl of local rice wine makkeolli.

Silk industry
Since ancient days, silk processed in Jinju has been known for its superior quality, which is a result of the combination of natural resources (such as clean water of Mt. Jirisan and so on) and human resources. Silk factories in Jinju annually spin out 70% of the national production. Jinju silk has a soft, refined feeling and elegant colors because of its superior dyeing techniques.

Education
Jinju is an educational city and is home to Gyeongsang National University and Chinju National University of Education, Gyeongnam National University of Science and Technology. It is also home to International University of Korea, catering mostly to foreign students. It also has a number of community colleges that serve the local area.  Jinju's high schools also offer a high quality of education and have a wide catchment area, reaching beyond the city limits to attract students from surrounding towns such as: Sacheon, Hadong and Sancheong.

Universities

Economy and business
Jinju was named as one of several 'enterprise cities' by the South Korean government. The government has supported Jinju as a hub of bio-industrial technological innovation from Dec. 1, 2000. The government provided 5 billion won from 2000 to 2004 in biological and chemical material industries in Jinju.  There are 618 manufacturing companies (the number of employees: 11,806), 1 local industrial complex and 4 rural industrial complexes as part of an integrated urban and rural city. Jinju Hyeoksin Dosi (New innovation city) established by President Noh Moohyun (2003-2007) with headquarters of vast LH corp. (State-run Land & Housing corp Toji Jutaek gongsa) and Namdong thermal power corp. etc.
Namdong thermal power is one of 5thermal power subsidiary, I.E.Nambu
(Southern) thermal in Busan, Dongseo thermal in Ulsan, Seobu (Western) in Taean,
Jungbu (Central) in Boryeong, Chungnam of Korea monopoly utility co. of giant Kepco in Naju of Gwangju metro head office.

Transportation

The main highway in Jinju is National Highway 10 or Namhae Expressway.

The closest airports to Jinju are Sacheon Airport (domestic) and Gimhae International Airport (International).

Jinju is served by passenger service at Jinju Station along the Gyeongjeon Line.

Climate

Twin towns – sister cities

Jinju is twinned with:

 Eugene, Oregon, United States (1961)
 Kitami, Japan (1985)
 Winnipeg, Canada (1992)
 Xi'an, Shaanxi, China (2016)

Friendship cities

 Kyoto, Japan (1999)
 Matsue, Japan (1999) 
 Omsk, Russia (2007)
 Zhengzhou, Henan, China (2000)

Gallery

Notable people
 Non-Gae - notable Gisaeng who jumped off a cliff into a river with Keyamura Rokusake resulting in both their deaths (Originally from Jangsu County, Jeollabuk-do)
Yoo Yeon-seok — actor.
 Kang Ho-dong — host, comedian, former Korean traditional wrestlers.
 Go A-ra — actress, model.
 Jung So-min — actress.
ASTRO Rocky (Real Name: Park Min-hyuk, Hangul: 박민혁) — idol.
Ateez Seonghwa (Real Name: Park Seong-hwa, Hangul: 박성화) - idol.
GreatGuys Horyeong (Real Name: Jeong Yeong-ki, Hangul: 정영기) - idol.

See also
 List of cities in South Korea

References

External links

City government website
Nongae Festival
Humans of Jinju : A photographic census of Jinju City

 

 
Cities in South Gyeongsang Province